Fritillaria crassifolia is a Middle Eastern species of bulb-forming flowering plant in the lily family Liliaceae, native to Iran, Iraq, Turkey, Syria, and Lebanon.

Subspecies
 Fritillaria crassifolia subsp. crassifolia - Iran, Turkey, Syria, and Lebanon
 Fritillaria crassifolia subsp. hakkarensis Rix - Iraq, Turkey
 Fritillaria crassifolia subsp. poluninii Rix - Iraq

formerly included
Fritillaria crassifolia subsp. kurdica (Boiss. & Noë) Rix, now called Fritillaria kurdica

References

crassifolia
Plants described in 1859
Taxa named by Pierre Edmond Boissier
Flora of Lebanon
[[Category:Taxa named by Alfred Huet du Pavillon]